The following have been listed as variant names of the Potomac River throughout its history by the Geographic Names Information System. The Board on Geographic Names officially decided upon Potomac as its spelling in 1931.

Potomac River 
Cheneoow-quoquey 	
Co-hon-go-roo-ta River 	
Co-hon-go-ru-ta River 	
Cohongaroota River 	
Cohongoluta River 	
Cohongoronta River 	
Cohongoronto River 	
Cohongoroota River 	
Cohongorooto River 	
Cohongoruton River 	
Elisabeth River 	
Elizabeth River 	
Kahongoronton River 	
Maryland River
Pataromerke River 	
Patawmack River 	
Patawomeck River 	
Patawomecke River 	
Patawomek River 	
Patawomeke River 	
Patomack River 	
Patomacke River 	
Patomak River 	
Patomake River 	
Patomeck River 	
Patomecke River 	
Patomeke River 	
Patoumak River 	
Patowmack River 	
Patowmacke River 	
Patowmec River 	
Patowmeck Flu 	
Patowmeck River 	
Patowomeck River 	
Patowomek River 	
Pawtomack River 	
Pokomoach River 	
Potamack River 	
Potamak River
Potawmack River 	
Potomack River 	
Potomacke River 	
Potomak River
Potomeack River 	
Potomock River 	
Potomoke River
Potomuck River 	
Potomucke River 	
Potowmac River
Potowmack River 	
Potowmak River 	
Potowomek River 	
Pottomock River 	
Powtowmac River 	
Powtowmack River 	
Quattaro 	
Qui-o-riough River 	
Quiriough River 	
River Potowmack 	
Saint Gregories River 	
Saint Gregory River 	
San Pedro River 	
Satawomeck 	
Turkey Bussard River 	
Wappacomma River

North Branch Potomac River 
Cohongoronton 	
Kahun-gulta 	
North Branch 	
North Branch Patamac River
North Fork Potomac River

South Branch Potomac River 
South Branch of Potowmac River 	
South Branch of the Potowmack River 	
South Fork Potomac River 	
Wapacomo River 	
Wapocomo River 	
Wappacoma River 	
Wappatomaka River 	
Wappatomica 	

Potomac River
Alternative place names